The Peale's Barber Farm Mastodon Exhumation Site, near Montgomery, New York, is the site of an 1801 exhumation of a mastodon which became "the world's first fully articulated prehistoric skeleton". The exhumation was led by artist/scientist Charles Willson Peale.

The site was listed on the U.S. National Register of Historic Places on October 20, 2009. The listing was announced as the featured listing in the National Park Service's weekly list of November 6, 2009.

The mastodon skeleton is exhibited at the Hessisches Landesmuseum Darmstadt in Darmstadt, Germany, though it was returned to the US for a temporary exhibit at the Smithsonian American Art Museum.

References

External links

National Register of Historic Places in Orange County, New York
Archaeological sites in New York (state)